Sanadze is a Georgian surname. Notable people with the surname include:

Duda Sanadze (born 1992), Georgian basketball player
Levan Sanadze (1928–1998), Georgian sprinter
Guivi Sanadze (born 1929), Georgian biologist

Georgian-language surnames